Saint Louis of Toulouse is a 1423–1425 gilded bronze sculpture of Louis of Toulouse by Donatello, measuring 2.26 m high by 0.85 m wide. It is now in the refectory of the Museo di Santa Croce in Florence.

It is the artist's earliest surviving bronze sculpture and was commissioned by the Guelphs for their external niche at the centre of the via de' Calzaiuoli facade of Orsanmichele - the saint had given up his crown for the religious life, an idea also favored by the Guelphs, who backed the papal party in the Investiture Controversy and later conflicts. The statue was completed in 1425, with Donatello also designing its niche according to Vasari, but in 1459 the niche was instead sold to the Tribunale della Mercanzia and used for their commission Christ and St. Thomas.

Donatello was still alive when the statue was instead taken to Santa Croce, which St Louis had visited, where it was placed on a central niche in the facade. When the 19th-century facade was built the sculpture was put into store and then into the museum. In 1943 the Orsanmichele sculptures and others were placed in secure storage for the duration of the war - St Louis was briefly placed in its original niche on the via de' Calzaiuoli facade of the Orsanmichele.

Bibliography
 Rolf C. Wirtz, Donatello, Könemann, Colonia 1998. 
Bonnie A. Bennett and David G. Wilkins, Donatello, Oxford 1984

Bronze sculptures in Florence
Louis
Sculptures by Donatello
1425 sculptures